Esteghlal Ladies Football Club, formerly known as Taj Ladies Football Club was a female football club based in Tehran, Iran.

History

Formation 

The club was formed in winter of 1971 as Taj by Taj sports and cultural organization. Taj was the first female football club in Iran and the first step towards introducing football to Iranian girls and women. The first club manager was Parivz Aboutaleb, former player of Taj F.C. and manager of Deyhim F.C. The first female football match ever held in Iran was a friendly mtach between Taj L.F.C. and Deyhim L.F.C. that ended in a 1–1 draw. This match was played in 2 halftimes of 30 minutes instead of normal 45 minutes.
In spring of the same year Taj invited a team of Italian footballers and played the first international match in Amjadieh stadium that ended in a 0–2 defeat for the Iranian side.

After Taj other Iranian clubs including Oghab F.C. Persepolis F.C. and Deyhim F.C. started their all female teams, the newer teams were not as powerful as Taj and their matches usually ended in Taj's victories.

The Iranian revolution stopped Taj LFC activities.

First revival 

In 2000s Esteghlal LFC, the new name of Taj after the revolution, restarted its activities and Esteghlal's academy had a section for girls football. In winter of 2009 a match between male and females youth teams which ended in 0–7 victory for the boys angered the authorities for breaching the country's strict gender segregation laws and put a stop on Esteghlal LFC activities for a second time in its history.

Second revival 
A few years latersand during tuner of a new chairman, Ali Fathollahzadeh Esteghlal restarted its ladies football section and this time Esteghlal LFC even participated in 3 seasons of Iranian football league. On fall of 2016 and with a new chairman Esteghlal LFC stopped its activities for a third time. Financial difficulties was announced the main reason of this decision by Reza Eftekhari, then chairman of the club.

See also 
 List of Esteghlal F.C. records and statistics
 List of Esteghlal F.C. honours
 Persepolis F.C. (women)

References

Bibliography 
 

Esteghlal F.C.
Association football clubs established in 1971
1971 establishments in Iran
1979 disestablishments in Iran
2016 disestablishments in Iran